Rybachy is a rural locality (a settlement) in Frunzenskoye Rural Settlement, Sredneakhtubinsky District, Volgograd Oblast, Russia. The population was 201 as of 2010. There are 8 streets.

Geography 
Rybachy is located 10 km west of Srednyaya Akhtuba (the district's administrative centre) by road. Novenky is the nearest rural locality.

References 

Rural localities in Sredneakhtubinsky District